The Abell Farmhouse and Barn was built in 1870.  It was listed on the National Register of Historic Places in 1987.

The Abell Farmhouse is an Italianate building.

It is part of the Cazenovia Town Multiple Resource Area.

References

Houses on the National Register of Historic Places in New York (state)
Barns on the National Register of Historic Places in New York (state)
Queen Anne architecture in New York (state)
Houses completed in 1870
Italianate architecture in New York (state)
Houses in Madison County, New York
National Register of Historic Places in Cazenovia, New York